Pamela Maru is a Cook Islands public servant and fisheries management adviser.

Maru began her career as a Cook Islands Fisheries Officer at the Ministry of Marine Resources, and later became a Fisheries Management Adviser at the Pacific Islands Forum Fisheries Agency in the Solomon Islands, a regional body responsible for fisheries management. From 2009 to 2011 she was Vice-Chair of the Western and Central Pacific Fisheries Commission (WCPFC) Scientific Committee. In 2017 she led the creation and implementation of a Port State Measure to combat illegal fishing through port inspections.

Maru has served as the Secretary of Marine Resources in the Cook Islands public service since 2018.

References

Living people
Year of birth missing (living people)
Cook Island women
Cook Island civil servants
Women civil servants